"Stupid" is a song written by Sarah McLachlan and produced by Pierre Marchand for McLachlan's 2003 album Afterglow. It was released as the album's second single in Australia and the United States in mid-2004. 

The song became McLachlan's highest charting single release in Australia, debuting at number thirty-seven in early June 2004. It spent seven weeks on the Australian ARIA Singles Chart, two of which were in the top fifty.

A remix of the song, titled "The Mark Bell Mix" was featured on So You Think You Can Dance.

Music video
The music video features McLachlan in different time periods and was directed by Sophie Muller.

Track listing
CD single
 "Stupid" — 3:26
 "Stupid" (Hyper remix) — 3:26
 "World on Fire" (Junkie XL club mix) — 12:21
 Enhanced with "Stupid" music video

Charts

Release history

Notes

2004 singles
Music videos directed by Sophie Muller
Sarah McLachlan songs
Arista Records singles
Songs written by Sarah McLachlan
2003 songs